Analog Trip is a South Korean travel documentary that premiered on YouTube Premium on 9 October 2019. The travel series was shot in Yogyakarta, Indonesia. It starred the members of the pop duo TVXQ; Changmin and Yunho, and boy band Super Junior; Leeteuk, Shindong, Eunhyuk, and Donghae.

Premise
The cast time travelled to the year 2002, when they were still trainees at SM Entertainment Starlight Academy. In order to return to 2019, they have to travel to several places in Yogyakarta, Indonesia and carry out tasks assigned to them. They also have to write diary entries, describing their daily experience during the travel and compose a theme song along the way. Their personal possessions were confiscated, and they were only supplied with meager allowance, digital camera, MP3 players, old-fashioned mobile phones, backpacks and a guitar.

All episodes were shot in Indonesia except for episode 12, which was shot in South Korea and Japan.

Cast

The cast are made up of the duo TVXQ and four members of the boyband Super Junior. All of them are signed artists under the company SM Entertainment.

Cast members:
TVXQ's U-Know Yunho - He stated that his experience while filming the show "felt more like making real memories than working" as he had been only travelling for work and not for leisure.
TVXQ's Max Changmin - He said that the journey was a time to reflect on their relationship with each other and how much they have changed compared to 15 or 16 years ago. He further said that the trip made each of them grow as a person.
Super Junior's Leeteuk - He described his experience filming in Indonesia as hard and difficult as they have to be careful because they were shooting at cultural heritage sites. Despite that, he said that it was more memorable because of the challenges. 
Super Junior's Shindong - He exclaimed that he was excited for the show being aired on YouTube Premium as they had only participated in television shows before.
Super Junior's Eunhyuk - He stated that as he has many memories of being trainees with Yunho, Changmin and Donghae, he felt it was less like a trip and more like a vacation at a holiday cottage.
Super Junior's Donghae - He said that he has fond memories with Yunho as they lived in the same dorm during trainee days, and with Changmin as they enlisted in the military together, but this is the first time he had ever travelled with them. He said that "it was a fun experience" and is open to the idea of doing it again in the future.

Episodes

Main episodes

Extras and behind the scenes

Production

Development and casting
Director and producer, Kim Ji-seon said the idea of creating a program that showcase the raw and true appearances of the cast started back in 2018. She explained that while she was working with signed artist from SM Entertainment, she realised that they have a deeper and more meaningful relationships between them. It was more evident among the members of TVXQ and Super Junior who shared the same living quarters while they were still trainees, and grew into popularity together. Despite that, their relationship had never been documented on film before.

Kota Asakura, the director of YouTube Original for the APAC region said that both groups debuted at young age and does not have the opportunity to create memories, thus the travel documentary gave them chance to gain world experience. He further said the cast are chosen because they have good relationship and chemistry with each other. Kim stated that they chose travel documentary as the genre for Analog Trip as it combined the show format that was favoured by the South Korean yet did not alienate the international viewer even with the language barrier.

Filming
In March 2019, a circular by the Ministry of Tourism of Indonesia, dated 13 March 2019, was leaked online. It stated that a crew of 60 people from SM Production and Denise Production were to film around Yogyakarta from 20 to 24 March 2019, with the members of the duo TVXQ and boyband Super Junior as actors. The actual principal photography was carried out from 19 to 24 March 2019 in Indonesia. It was held at Bali on 19 March 2019 and Yogyakarta, from 20 to 24 March 2019. The cast stated that despite having travelled to Indonesia multiple times for work before, it was their first time going to Bali and Yogyakarta. Additional shooting for inserts was held for about ten days after the principal photography is finished.

A few tourist attractions were featured in the series. They are Borobudur temple, Mount Merapi, Jomblang cave, Parangtritis beach and Prambanan temple. The producer, Kim Ji-seon said that she chose Indonesia as the setting due to the country's tendency of preserving the cultural heritages. She felt that it was a place where the cast could explore their friendship in the past and present, and have the experience of going for a school trip.

The documentary was shot in 4K resolution, making it the first Korean show to aired on YouTube to do so. Because of this, the crew had to build new hard drives to accommodate the large size of the raw films. The post-production process took up to six months to finish as it had to go through four major editing processes.

Soundtrack

The show's soundtrack was released on 15 November 2019 on several Korean online music store, music streaming services and Super Junior YouTube channel. The music video was released on 27 December 2019. The creation process of the track was shown on episode 12 of Analog Trip.

Release
Analog Trip aired as a YouTube Original and premiered on YouTube Premium on 9 October 2019. All twelve episodes were immediately available for YouTube Premium subscribers, while new episodes were released every subsequent Wednesday for other viewers. The final episode was aired on 1 January 2020. A live stream entitled "Analog Trip After Party 'Apa Kabar! Indonesia'" was broadcast on 22 January 2020 at SMTown Youtube channel, featuring the cast members. In the live stream, they interacted with the audience by playing games, answering viewers' questions that were selected beforehand and giving insights of their experience filming the show. A photo of the cast was uploaded on TVXQ's and Super Junior's social media after the broadcast ended, with the caption expressing thanks to the viewers for watching and supporting the show. The live stream broadcast was posted on 18 February 2020 and listed as episode thirteen of Analog Trip.

The second and seventh episode that were scheduled to be aired on 16 October and 27 November 2019 were both delayed, to respect the death of the casts' label mate, Sulli and actress Goo Hara, who died on 14 October and 24 November 2019, respectively. The second episode aired on the following week, on 23 October while the seventh episode aired together with the eighth episode on 4 December 2019.

Sequel
In the interview held on 30 September 2019, producer Kim Ji-seon said that it was too early to talk about a sequel. She also said that if there is a second season, it might be in a different place like Russia or with different cast. On 4 June 2021, it was announced that a second season starring boyband NCT 127 would be released in the second half of 2021. Its official title was announced as Analog Trip NCT 127: Escape From Magic Island and the first episode was released on 29 October 2021 on YouTube.

Notes

References

External links

Korean-language television shows
YouTube Premium original series
2019 South Korean television series debuts